Eristalini is a tribe of hoverflies. Several species are well-known honeybee mimics, such as the drone fly Eristalis tenax, while other genera such as Helophilus and Parhelophilus exhibit wasp-like patterns of yellow and black stripes, both strategies to avoid predation by visual predators such as birds.

They breed in decaying organic materials such as run-offs from dung heaps (Eristalis) or in ponds and ditches (e.g. Anasimyia). Some others, such as Myathropa and Mallota, breed in wet rotting tree stumps and rot holes.

A characteristic feature of this tribe is the "rat-tailed maggot" with a rear positioned telescopic breathing tube, allowing the larvae to breathe while living submerged in water or mud. This feature is also shared with another hoverfly tribe the Sericomyiini though those flies do not share the characteristic eristaline dip in wing vein R4+5.

List of genera 
Thompson considers the tribe Sericomyiini a subtribe of the Eristalini while others separate it.

Subtribe: Eristalina
Austalis Thompson & Vockeroth, 2003
Axona Walker, 1864
Digulia Meijere, 1913
Dissoptera Edwards, 1915
Eristalinus Rondani, 1845 
Eristalis Latreille, 1804 
Keda Curran, 1931
Kertesziomyia Shiraki, 1930 
Lycastrirhyncha Bigot, 1859
Meromacroides Curran, 1927
Meromacrus Rondani, 1849
Palpada Macquart, 1834
Phytomia Guerin-Meneville, 1833
Senaspis Macquart, 1850
Simoides Loew, 1858
Solenaspis Osten Sacken, 1881

Subtribe: Helophilina
Anasimyia Schiner, 1864 
Austrophilus Thompson, 2000
Chasmomma Bezzi, 1915
Dolichogyna Macquart, 1842
Habromyia Williston, 1888
Helophilus Meigen, 1822
Lejops Rondani, 1857 
Mallota Meigen, 1822 
Mesembrius Rondani, 1857
Myathropa Rondani, 1845
Ohmyia Thompson, 1999
Parhelophilus Girschner, 1897
Quichuana Knab, 1913

References 

Eristalinae
Brachycera tribes